This article is an attempt to list all agricultural pest nematodes. Species are sorted in alphabetical order of Latin name.

A 
 Achlysiella williamsi
 Anguina agrostis
 Anguina amsinckiae
 Anguina australis
 Anguina balsamophila
 Anguina funesta
 Anguina graminis
 Anguina spermophaga
 Anguina tritici
 Aphelenchoides arachidis
 Aphelenchoides besseyi
 Aphelenchoides fragariae
 Aphelenchoides parietinus
 Aphelenchoides ritzemabosi
 Aphelenchoides subtenuis

B 
 Belonolaimus gracilis
 Belonolaimus longicaudatus

C 
 Craspedonema elegans

D 
 Ditylenchus africanus
 Ditylenchus angustus
 Ditylenchus destructor
 Ditylenchus dipsaci
 Dolichodorus heterocephalus

G 
 Globodera pallida
 Globodera rostochiensis
 Globodera tabacum

H 
 Helicotylenchus dihystera
 Hemicriconemoides kanayaensis
 Hemicriconemoides mangiferae
 Hemicycliophora arenaria
 Heterodera avenae
 Heterodera cajani
 Heterodera carotae
 Heterodera ciceri
 Hoplolaimus galeatus
 Heterodera glycines (Soybean cyst nematode)
 Hoplolaimus indicus
 Hoplolaimus magnistylus
 Hoplolaimus seinhorsti
 Hoplolaimus uniformis

L 
 Longidorus africanus
 Longidorus maximus
 Longidorus sylphus

M 
 Meloidogyne acronea
 Meloidogyne arenaria
 Meloidogyne artiellia
 Meloidogyne brevicauda
 Meloidogyne chitwoodi
 Meloidogyne enterolobii
 Meloidogyne hapla (Northern root-knot nematode)
 Meloidogyne incognita
 Meloidogyne javanica
 Meloidogyne naasi
 Meloidogyne partityla
 Meloidogyne thamesi
 Merlinius brevidens
 Mesocriconema xenoplax

N 
 Nacobbus aberrans

P 
 Paralongidorus maximus
 Paratrichodorus minor
 Paratylenchus curvitatus
 Paratylenchus elachistus
 Paratylenchus hamatus
 Paratylenchus macrophallus
 Paratylenchus microdorus
 Paratylenchus projectus
 Paratylenchus tenuicaudatus
 Pratylenchus alleni
 Pratylenchus vulnus

Q 
 Quinisulcius acutus
 Quinisulcius capitatus

R 
 Radopholus similis

T 
 Tylenchorhynchus brevilineatus
 Tylenchorhynchus claytoni
 Tylenchorhynchus dubius
 Tylenchorhynchus maximus
 Tylenchorhynchus nudus
 Tylenchorhynchus phaseoli
 Tylenchorhynchus vulgaris
 Tylenchorhynchus zeae
 Tylenchulus semipenetrans

X 
 Xiphinema americanum
 Xiphinema bakeri
 Xiphinema brevicolle
 Xiphinema diversicaudatum
 Xiphinema index
 Xiphinema insigne
 Xiphinema rivesi
 Xiphinema vuittenezi

See also 
 Cereal cyst nematode
 Coffee root-knot nematode
 Foliar nematode
 Potato cyst nematode

References 

 List of
Agricultural pest nematodes